Steve Bernard (August 25, 1947 – March 7, 2009) was an American adventurer and businessman who founded Cape Cod Potato Chips with his brother Jude.

Biography
Born on August 25, 1947 in Concord, New Hampshire, Bernard attended the University of Notre Dame, where he earned a degree in economics. A restless adventurer, he spent the decade following his graduation crossing the country by hitchhiking, in Alaska fighting forest fires and sailing to the Caribbean, working with chickens and catching tuna, as well as installing car sun roofs.

Cape Cod Potato Chips

With the idea of offering healthier foods made with little processing, his wife, Lynn, had started a natural foods store in the 1970s. Bernard pursued adding potato chips to the mix after tasting a natural potato chip from a successful company based in Hawaii. In 1980, he sold his auto parts business and established Cape Cod Potato Chips with an  storefront in Hyannis, Massachusetts that could reach tourists, an industrial potato slicer he had bought for $3,000 and almost no knowledge of the snack food business other than what he learned in a week-long course on potato chip making at Martin's Potato Chips in Thomasville, Pennsylvania.

Unlike typical commercial brands made using a continuous frying process, in which potato slices travel through a tub of oil on a conveyor belt, Cape Cod chips are cooked in batches in kettles, frying them in a shallow vat in oil while stirring with a rake, producing a crunchier chip. Snack Food Association president James A. McCarthy noted that Bernard "didn't invent the kettle chip, but he was involved in bringing it back to prominence."

The company struggled for months after it opened on July 4, 1980. The following winter a car crashed through the front window of the store, almost hitting his daughter. An insurance payment and publicity from the accident helped tide the company over until the following summer, by which time business was booming, and the company's chips were being sold through a number of supermarket chains.

The company was acquired by Anheuser-Busch in 1985, and operated as a division of its Eagle Snacks unit. Sales of the chips were up to 80,000 bags a day by the end of the following year, reaching the entire East Coast, with sales of $16 million annually. Bernard bought the company and its factory back from Anheuser-Busch in 1996. Snack food company Lance Inc. bought the company from Bernard in 1996, by which time annual sales had reached $30 million.

Personal
Bernard started a sandwich shop, which made croutons from leftover bread. This led to the creation of Chatham Village Foods, which manufactured croutons, a company he later sold to the T. Marzetti Company. Lured out of "retirement" by daughter, Nicole, they together co-founded Late July Organic Snacks, a company that produces organic cookies and crackers, in 2001.

A resident of Marstons Mills, Massachusetts and Sanibel, Florida, Bernard died at age 61 on March 7, 2009 in Hyannis, Massachusetts due to pancreatic cancer. He was survived by his wife, daughter and two grandchildren, as well as three brothers and a sister.

References 

1947 births
2009 deaths
American food company founders
Deaths from cancer in Massachusetts
Deaths from pancreatic cancer
People from Marstons Mills, Massachusetts
People from Concord, New Hampshire
People from Sanibel, Florida